This page lists the World Best Year Performance in the year 2011 in both the men's and the women's hammer throw. The main event during this season were the 2011 World Championships in Athletics in Daegu, South Korea, where the final of the men's competition was held on August 29, 2011. The women had their final six days later, on September 4, 2011.

Men

Records

2011 World Year Ranking

Women

Records

2011 World Year Ranking

References 
 IAAF (men; women)

2011
Hammer Throw Year Ranking, 2011